Hiroshi Nakano may refer to:

 Hiroshi Nakano (Gravitation), a character in the manga series Gravitation
 Hiroshi Nakano (footballer) (born 1983), Japanese football defender
 Hiroshi Nakano (rower) (born 1987), Japanese rower